Adrianople (Edirne), a major Byzantine city in Thrace, was conquered by the Ottomans sometime in the 1360s, and eventually became the Ottoman capital, until the Fall of Constantinople in 1453.

Background
Following the capture of Gallipoli by the Ottomans in 1354, Turkish expansion in the southern Balkans was rapid. Although they had to halt their advance during the Kidnapping of Şehzade Halil between 1357–59, after Halil's rescue they resumed their advance. The main target of the advance was Adrianople, which was the third most important Byzantine city (after Constantinople and Thessalonica). Whether under Ottoman control or as independent ghazi or akinji warrior bands, the Turks seized Demotika (Didymoteicho) in 1360 or 1361 and Filibe (Philippopolis) in 1363. Despite the recovery of Gallipoli for Byzantium by the Savoyard Crusade in 1366, an increasing number of Turcoman warriors crossed over from Anatolia into Europe, gradually acquiring control of the plains of Thrace and pushing to the Rhodope Mountains in the west and the Bulgarian principalities in the north.

Capture of Adrianople
The date of Adrianople's fall to the Turks has been disputed among scholars due to the differing accounts in the source material, with the years 1361 to 1362, 1367 and 1371 variously proposed. Following sources dating from long after the events, earlier scholarship generally placed the conquest between 1361 and 1363, in accordance with the report in Ottoman sources that a solar eclipse occurred in the year of Adrianople's fall. Thus later Turkish sources report that Lala Shahin Pasha defeated the Byzantine ruler (tekfur) of the city at a battle in Sazlıdere southeast of the city, forcing him to flee secretly by boat. The inhabitants, left to their fate, agreed to surrender the city in July 1362 in exchange for a guarantee of freedom to continue to live in the city as before.

Based on Elisabeth Zachariadou's examination of previously unregarded Byzantine sources, most modern scholars have moved to the view that the city was captured in 1369. Thus a poem from the city's metropolitan bishop to Emperor John V Palaiologos shows Adrianople to have still been in Byzantine hands in Christmas 1366, while a series of Byzantine short chronicles place the date of its capture in 1369. In addition, modern scholars opine that the capture of Adrianople may not have been carried out by Ottoman Turks, but by others among the many independently operating akinji groups in the region.

Aftermath
The city, now renamed Edirne, was taken over and continued for some time to be administered by Lala Shahin Pasha, while Sultan Murad I held court at the old capital at Bursa and only entered the city in the winter of 1376/7, when Emperor Andronikos IV Palaiologos ceded Gallipoli to Murad in exchange for his help in a dynastic civil war.

Edirne did not immediately become the Ottomans' capital; Murad's court continued to reside in Bursa and in nearby Demotika, as well as Edirne. Nevertheless, the city quickly became the main Ottoman military centre in the Balkans, and it was there that Süleyman Çelebi, one of the contenders for the Ottoman throne during the Ottoman Interregnum of 1402–13, moved the state treasury.

References

Sources
 
 
 
 
 
 
 

1360s conflicts
Adrianople
Adrianople
Adrianople
History of Edirne
Ottoman Thrace
1360s in Europe
1360s in the Byzantine Empire
1360s in the Ottoman Empire